The 1969 Florida State Seminoles football team represented Florida State University in the 1969 NCAA University Division football season. This was Bill Peterson's tenth year as head coach, and he led the team to an 6–3–1 record.

Schedule

Roster
QB #14 Bill Cappleman, Sr.

References

Florida State
Florida State Seminoles football seasons
Florida State Seminoles football